Reva Institute of Technology and Management is a private state University located in Bangalore, Karnataka. REVA Group of Educational Institutions was established in 2002, managed by Rukmini Educational Charitable Trust. In 2004 it was taken over by Rukmini Educational Charitable Trust led by Dr. P. Shyama Raju.  REVA University was established in 2004 as an educational venture by Divyasree Developers.

Academic units and programs 

REVA offers undergraduate courses and Bachelor of Engineering programmes  in six disciplines and postgraduate programmes.

Extension center in REVA which offers two part-time postgraduate courses: M.Tech in VLSI Design and Embedded Systems and M.Tech in Computer Network Engineering.

Placements
The Training & Placement (T&P) department is primarily a liaison between industry and the institute to assist graduates with job placement. The Institute reported the following placement statistics.

References 

All India Council for Technical Education